The 1879 North Norfolk by-election was fought on 21 January 1879.  The byelection was fought due to the death of the incumbent Conservative MP, James Duff.  It was won by the Conservative candidate Edward Birkbeck.

The result
It was won by the Conservative candidate Edward Birkbeck.

References

1879 in England
1879 elections in the United Kingdom
By-elections to the Parliament of the United Kingdom in Norfolk constituencies
19th century in Norfolk